The phrase good and necessary consequence was used more commonly several centuries ago to express the idea which would today fall under the general heading of logic; that is, to reason validly by logical deduction or better, deductive reasoning. 

Even more particularly, it would be understood in terms of term logic, also known as traditional logic. Many today would also consider good and necessary consequence to be part of formal logic, which deals with the form (or logical form) of arguments as to which are valid or invalid.

In this context, one may better understand the word "good" in the phrase "good and necessary consequence" more technically as intending a "valid argument form."

One of the best recognized articulations of the authoritative and morally binding use of good and necessary consequence to make deductions from Scripture appears in probably the most famous of Protestant confessions of faith, the Westminster Confession of Faith (1646), Chapter 1, sec. 6, as well as in others, including the Heidelberg Catechism, and the Belgic Confession.

References

 Carlos Bovell, By Good and Necessary Consequence: A Preliminary Genealogy of Biblicist Foundationalism (WIPF and Stock), 2009.

Term logic
Deductive reasoning